La Torre de Esteban Hambrán is a Spanish village and municipality in the province of Toledo in Castile-La Mancha. It is adjacent to the municipalities of Santa Cruz del Retamar, Méntrida, Casarrubios del Monte, and Las Ventas de Retamosa.

Origin of name 

The village's name, which means "Tower of Esteban Hambrán" in English, may be derived from an old Muslim tower once belonging to a 12th-century Mozarab nobleman, Esteban ben Ambrán.  The tower was used to communicate, by means of fire signals, with the distant Castle of Alamín.

History 

The town was founded by the Romans in 171 BC, but little is known about the Roman era of the village. After the Reconquista, the area around the "Esteban Hambrán" tower became populated. In the early 15th century, the land belonged to Pero López de Ayala. The village was bought in 1436 by Álvaro de Luna. When some years later John II of Castile confiscated the place, the village became crown property.

Demography 

The population was 1,756 in 2006.

Monuments 

 St. Anne's Chapel
 St. Rochus' Chapel
 St. Mary Magdalene's Parish Church
 St. John the Evangelist's Franciscan Convent
 Several fountains 
 Funeral Catafalque

References

External links
 Delegation of Toledo.
 List of mayors: MAP.

Torre De Esteban Hambran